Death of a Train is a crime novel by Freeman Wills Crofts, published in 1946.

Synopsis

Set during World War II, a network of German secret agents plans to derail a train carrying vital war supplies. Due to a delay another train is derailed instead, the intended one then being diverted safely round the blockage. Inspector French tracks down the conspirators, nearly losing his life in a heroic final action to prevent their escape.

1946 British novels
Novels by Freeman Wills Crofts
Novels set during World War II
Novels about rail transport
Hodder & Stoughton books
British detective novels
British spy novels
British thriller novels